Lectionary 1614, designated by ℓ 1614 in the Gregory-Aland numbering. 
It is a Coptic/Greek bilingual manuscript of the New Testament, on parchment leaves, dated paleographically to the 7th or 8th century.

Description 

The codex contains some Lessons from the four Gospels lectionary (Evangelistarium) (Luke 1:39–56 [Greek]  Luke 1:39–56 [Coptic]; Mark 4:23—5:16; Matt 25:3–13 [Coptic]; Luke 1:39–48 [Coptic]). It additionally contains some non-biblical text in Greek and Coptic. It is written in Greek Uncial letters, on 4 leaves (32.5 by 28 cm), 2 columns per page, 33 lines per page. 

The codex is now located in the University of Michigan (MS. 124) in Ann Arbor.

See also  

 List of New Testament lectionaries 
 Coptic versions of the Bible 
 Textual criticism

References

External links  

 Lectionary 1614 at the CSNTM 

Greek New Testament lectionaries 
Greek-Coptic diglot manuscripts of the New Testament
8th-century biblical manuscripts